Valero may refer to:

People
 Valero (name)

Other
 Valero, a prefix referring to derivatives of valeric acid
 Valero Energy, an American Fortune 500 company operating a variety of energy production and fuel retail operations, based in San Antonio, Texas
 Valero, Salamanca, a municipality in the province of Salamanca, Spain
 Valero Texas Open, professional golf tournament on the PGA Tour
 Estadio Manuel Martínez Valero, football stadium located in Elche, Spain